Tao Yujia (born 16 February 1987 in Jiujiang, Jiangxi) is a Chinese sprinter who specializes in the 100 metres. Her personal best time is 11.37 seconds, achieved in July 2011 in Nanjing.

Tao represented China at the 2008 Summer Olympics in Beijing competing at the 4x100 metres relay together with Wang Jing, Jiang Lan and Qin Wangping. In their first round heat they placed fourth behind Jamaica, Russia and Germany. Their time of 43.78 seconds was the tenth time overall out of sixteen participating nations. With this result they failed to qualify for the final.

References

Team China 2008

1987 births
Living people
Athletes (track and field) at the 2008 Summer Olympics
Chinese female sprinters
Olympic athletes of China
People from Jiujiang
Runners from Jiangxi
Athletes (track and field) at the 2010 Asian Games
Athletes (track and field) at the 2014 Asian Games
Asian Games medalists in athletics (track and field)
Asian Games gold medalists for China
Asian Games silver medalists for China
Medalists at the 2010 Asian Games
Medalists at the 2014 Asian Games
Olympic female sprinters
21st-century Chinese women